Parachironomus is a genus of non-biting midges in the subfamily Chironominae of the bloodworm family Chironomidae.

Species
P. abortivus (Malloch, 1915)
P. aculeatus (Kieffer, 1921)
P. acutus (Goetghebuer, 1936)
P. alatus (Beck, 1962)
P. arcuatus (Goetghebuer, 1919)
P. biannulatus (Stæger, 1839)
P. carinatus (Townes, 1945)
P. chaetaolus (Sublette, 1960)
P. cinctellus (Goetghebuer, 1921)
P. danicus Lehmann, 1970
P. digitalis (Edwards, 1929)
P. directus (Dendy & Sublette, 1959)
P. elodeae (Townes, 1945)
P. forceps (Townes, 1945)
P. frequens (Johannsen, 1905)
P. kuzini Shilova, 1969
P. longiforceps Kruseman, 1933
P. mauricii (Kruseman, 1933)
P. monochromus (van der Wulp, 1874)
P. paradigitalis Brundin, 1949
P. parilis (Walker, 1856)
P. pectinatellae (Dendy & Sublette, 1959)
P. potamogeti (Townes, 1945)
P. schneideri Beck & Beck, 1969
P. siljanensis Brundin, 1949
P. subalpinus (Goetghebuer, 1932)
P. sublettei (Beck, 1961)
P. swammerdami (Kruseman, 1933)
P. tenuicaudatus (Malloch, 1915)
P. varus (Goetghebuer, 1921)
P. vitiosus (Goetghebuer, 1921)

References

Chironomidae
Diptera of Europe